The women's 200 metres at the 2003 All-Africa Games were held on October 13–14.

Medalists

Results

Heats
Qualification: First 2 of each heat (Q) and the next 2 fastest (q) qualified for the semifinal.

Wind:Heat 1: -0.5 m/s, Heat 2: +0.4 m/s, Heat 3: 0.0 m/s

Final
Wind: -0.3 m/s

References
Results
Results

200